Nahuel Arena (born Buenos Aires, June 2, 1998) is an Argentine professional footballer who plays as a defender for Ferro Carril Oeste.

Arena made his debut for Vélez Sarsfield in the Argentine Primera Division on August 10, 2018 against Newell's Old Boys.

Statistics 
Actualizado al 25 de mayo de 2019

References

Living people
1998 births
Association football defenders
Argentine footballers
Club Atlético Vélez Sarsfield footballers
Godoy Cruz Antonio Tomba footballers